In the 2010s, the Belgium national football team missed out on both the 2010 World Cup and Euro 2012, but improved greatly in the next years. They secured qualification for the 2014 World Cup with an impressive unbeaten record, and achieved sixth place at the finals: their second-best result ever (after reaching fourth in 1986) at the time. The improved results led to Belgium reaching the top position on the FIFA World Rankings for the first time, in November 2015. They had a setback losing to Wales in the quarter finals at Euro 2016, but improved there play under a new coach, reaching their best result ever at the 2018 FIFA World Cup, ending third.

The overall balance over the course of the decade was positive, with 74 wins versus 16 losses and 21 draws.

Results

111 official matches played:

See also
 Competitive record of the Belgium national football team (with tournament history and all-time team record)

Footnotes

References

External links

football
2010s
2009–10 in Belgian football
2010–11 in Belgian football
2011–12 in Belgian football
2013–14 in Belgian football
2014–15 in Belgian football
2015–16 in Belgian football
2016–17 in Belgian football
2017–18 in Belgian football
2018–19 in Belgian football
2019–20 in Belgian football